A Prayer Before Dawn is a 2017 biographical prison drama film directed by Jean-Stéphane Sauvaire and written by Jonathan Hirschbein and Nick Saltrese. The film stars Joe Cole and is based on the book A Prayer Before Dawn: My Nightmare in Thailand's Prisons by Billy Moore. 

A Prayer Before Dawn had its world premiere at the 2017 Cannes Film Festival on 19 May, and was released in the United Kingdom on 20 July 2018, by Altitude, and in the United States on 10 August 2018, by A24.

Plot
Billy Moore, a young British boxer and troubled heroin addict, is arrested in Thailand after being charged with possession of stolen goods and a firearm. 

Incarcerated into Klong Prem prison, Billy is quickly subjugated to the horrors of Thai prison life, including being moved into a crowded mass ruled by cell boss Keng, forced to sleep next to a corpse and witnessing at knifepoint the rape of a fellow inmate. Billy's experiences with the other prisoners and personnel are tense, at one point going into a violent frenzy and biting into the neck of a corrections officer after being refused painkillers. Following his punishment, Billy attempts to befriend a transgender prisoner named Fame. Life in prison worsens for Billy, and he retreats into heavy drug abuse; he subsequently beats two Muslim chefs half to death after being bribed ya ba by a corrupt corrections officer.

Billy's psyche finally breaks; he attempts suicide by slitting his wrist, though he survives. With a desperate need to fight again and battle his demons, Billy eventually joins the boxing team with the help of Fame, with whom he later develops a romance. Billy quickly adapts to the art of Muay Thai and wins his first bout in a close back-and-forth brawl. Impressed by his performance, prison warden Preecha has him transferred into the boxing team cell, being the first foreigner to compete in the national Muay Thai tournament and represent the prison. 

There he soon develops a camaraderie with the other boxers, receiving a tattoo on his back. However, Billy is ambushed by Keng and his gang, who threaten him with a pin prick attack if he loses the tournament. Even worse, it is established that Billy is suffering from a hernia due to his drug abuse, and any subsequent damage could result in severe internal bleeding. Regardless, Billy still desires to compete. The resulting match is gruelling for Billy, as he takes multiple shots to the stomach and is also fouled by his opponent. However, Billy manages to knock him out with a spinning back elbow and wins the fight using what he learned. Despite the victory, the physical trauma is too much, and Billy ends up vomiting blood and passing out.

Billy is quickly rushed to the hospital, and after waking up, he sneaks out of the building and into the cityscape. Billy soon reconsiders his actions and returns to the hospital. After being transferred, he meets his father (played by the real Billy Moore), and the two exchange a solemn smile. Closing titles reveal that after serving three years, Billy Moore was transferred to a UK prison and released on an amnesty by the King of Thailand in October 2010. Since his release, he has devoted his life to working with other addicts and fighting to maintain his recovery.

Cast
 Joe Cole as Billy Moore
 Pornchanok Mabklang as Fame
 Panya Yimmumphai as Keng
 Somluck Kamsing as Trainer 
 Vithaya Pansringarm as Officer Preecha
 Billy Moore as Billy's Father

Production
In October 2014, Charlie Hunnam would star in the film, with Jean-Stéphane Sauvaire directing from a screenplay written by Jonathan Hirschbein and Nick Saltrese, based upon a memoir written by Billy Moore. Rita Dagher, Sol Papadopoulos, and Roy Boutler will serve as producers on their Senorita Films banner, alongside HanWay Films. In October 2015, Joe Cole joined the cast of the film, replacing Hunnam.

Thai authorities denied permission to film in the real Chiang Mai Central Prison and Klong Prem Central Prison, where Moore served his sentences, so production decided to film scenes set in both prisons at Nakhon Pathom prison, which was decommissioned in 2014 and now acts as a museum. The climax, however, was filmed at the courtyard of the Cebu Provincial Detention and Rehabilitation Center, known for the CPDRC Dancing Inmates. Several of CPDRC's inmates participated in the shoot.

Release
A Prayer Before Dawn: A Nightmare in Thailand was first published in 2014 by Maverick House, Dublin, Ireland. In February 2017, A24 acquired U.S. distribution rights to the film. In April 2017, Altitude Film Distribution acquired U.K. distribution rights to the film. The film had its world premiere at the Cannes Film Festival on 15 May 2017. It went onto screen at South by Southwest on 12 March 2018.

It was released in the United Kingdom on 20 July 2018, and in the United States through DirecTV Cinema on 12 July 2018, before being released in a limited release on 10 August 2018.

Reception
On review aggregator website Rotten Tomatoes, the film has an approval rating of 92% based on 63 reviews, and an average rating of 7.5/10. The website's critical consensus reads, "A Prayer Before Dawn is far from an easy watch, but this harrowing prison odyssey delivers rich rewards — led by an outstanding central performance from Joe Cole." On Metacritic, the film has a weighted average score of 76 out of 100, based on 17 critics, indicating "generally favorable reviews".

References

External links
 

2017 films
2017 action drama films
American martial arts films
American prison drama films
English-language French films
French action drama films
British action drama films
English-language Chinese films
Chinese action drama films
A24 (company) films
Films shot in Thailand
Films set in Thailand
Films based on autobiographies
Muay Thai films
2010s English-language films
Films directed by Jean-Stéphane Sauvaire
2010s American films
2010s British films
2010s French films